Pava Grigorevna Turtygina (26 December 1902 – 1985) was a Russian composer.

Turtygina was born in Gomel. She studied at the Ekaterinoslav Music School (1915-1919), today known as the Dnipropetrovsk Academy of Music in Ukraine; at the Gnessin State Musical College (1921-1922) with Elena Gnesina; and at the Moscow Conservatory (1938-1940).

Turtygina worked as a pianist. Her music was included on at least one LP recording: Aprelevka #7334 (1938). Her compositions were published by the State Music Publishing House known as Muzgiz or Muzyka, which in 2004 became P. Jurgenson. Her vocal compositions include:

"Krasnoflotskaya" (text by Y. Rodionov)

"Pod Znamenem" (Under the Banner; text by Aleksandr Kovalenkov)

"Pokhodnaya Komsomolskaya" (text by I. Molchanov)

"Spain Will Be Free" (text by Sergey Alymov)

References 

Russian composers
Russian women composers
Russian pianists
Russian women pianists
1902 births
1985 deaths